Seyed Hossein Mousavian (born 1941 in Tehran) is an Iranian physician and political activist affiliated with the National Front. He currently serves as the party's chairman.

References

Leaders of the National Front (Iran)
Living people
People from Tehran
Year of birth missing (living people)